Josef Manger (26 May 1913 – 13 March 1991) was a German heavyweight weightlifter who won a European title in 1935, an Olympic gold medal in 1936, and two world titles in 1937 and 1938. Between 1935 and 1941 he set 11 ratified world records, ten in the press and one in the snatch. His career was cut short by World War II, after which he worked as a salesman. A street in Bamberg, his hometown, was named in his honor.

References 

1913 births
1991 deaths
People associated with physical culture
Sportspeople from Bamberg
German male weightlifters
Olympic weightlifters of Germany
Weightlifters at the 1936 Summer Olympics
Olympic gold medalists for Germany
Olympic medalists in weightlifting
Medalists at the 1936 Summer Olympics
European Weightlifting Championships medalists
World Weightlifting Championships medalists
20th-century German people